Triad Hospitals was a hospital operator based in Plano, Texas. Spun off from Hospital Corporation of America in 1999, it acquired Quorum Health Group in 2000 to become the third-largest investor-owned hospital group. It was merged into Community Health Systems in 2007.

In February 2007 it received a merger/buyout offer from Goldman Sachs Capital Partners and CCMP Capital. It received a superior merger/buyout offer in March 2007 from Community Health Systems of $54/share. The buyout was completed in July 2007.

See also
 Beacon Hospital 
List of Texas companies (T)

References

External links
Fortune 500 2007: Triad Hospitals

Companies based in Plano, Texas
Private equity portfolio companies
Hospital networks in the United States
Companies disestablished in 2007
Medical and health organizations based in Texas